The North East Isle, part of the Kent Group, is an unpopulated  granite island, located in the Bass Strait, lying off the north-east coast of Tasmania, between the Furneaux Group and Wilsons Promontory in Victoria, Australia.

The island has been unmodified by human activity.

Fauna
Recorded breeding seabird and wader species include little penguin, short-tailed shearwater, fairy prion, common diving-petrel, Pacific gull and sooty oystercatcher.  Also present are the white-footed dunnart and White's skink.

See also

 List of islands of Tasmania

References

External links
 

Islands of North East Tasmania
Protected areas of Tasmania
Islands of Bass Strait